Coto Colorado River is a river of Costa Rica that is located on the Pacific Ocean coast.

References

Rivers of Costa Rica